St. Cecilia is a Roman Catholic church in Stamford, Connecticut, United States, part of the Diocese of Bridgeport.

History 
The church is located in the Springdale section of Stamford. The church was built 1939 to the designs of Stamford resident and distinguished architect Gustave E. Steinback.

References

External links 
 St. Cecelia - Diocesan information
 Diocese of Bridgeport
 www.stceciliastamford.org

Roman Catholic churches in Stamford, Connecticut